The Aba Daba Music Hall was co-founded by Aline Waites in 1969 at the Mother Redcap pub in Camden Town, London, England. The other original directors were David Ryder Futcher, Barrymore Brown, and Janet Browning. It transferred to the Pindar of Wakefield the following year, and stayed there until 1985, when the Pindar was sold and renamed The Water Rats. The Aba Daba Theatre Company stayed at the Water Rats until 1988. They started a new project at Underneath The Arches in Southwark in 1991, and carried on there until 1996.

The Aba Daba Theatre Company have produced shows at the Canal Cafe, Little Venice, The Hollywood Arms, Chelsea and the Star and Garter, Putney, in addition to many West End and regional theatres. They have toured extensively in Scandinavia and other parts of Europe, Canada, and the United States.

Waites produced the shows from the very beginning. Many musical comedies and revues were written by Waites and Robin Hunter. Together with musical director, David Wykes, they wrote The Illustrated Victorian Songbook, published by Michael Joseph in 1985.

Other company directors have included Shaun Curry, Robin Hunter, Geoffrey Robinson, David Wykes and Tony Locantro. David Wykes, Paul Smith, Mike Dixon, Peter Pontzen, Barry Booth and Tony Locantro were among the music directors.

Theatres in the London Borough of Camden
Theatre companies in London